Lionychus is a genus of beetles in the family Carabidae, containing the following species:

 Lionychus albivittis Bates, 1886 
 Lionychus albonotatus (Dejean, 1825) 
 Lionychus anamalai Jedlicka, 1969 
 Lionychus basalis Peringuey, 1896 
 Lionychus beccarii Gestro, 1889 
 Lionychus bivittatus Fairmaire, 1899 
 Lionychus chujoi Jedlicka, 1966 
 Lionychus cinctus Chaudoir, 1848
 Lionychus damarensis Kuntzen, 1919 
 Lionychus fleischeri Reitter, 1908 
 Lionychus himalayicus Andrewes, 1931 
 Lionychus horni Dupuis, 1913 
 Lionychus laetulus Peringuey, 1904 
 Lionychus laosensis Jedlicka, 1966 
 Lionychus marginellus Schmidt-Goebel, 1846 
 Lionychus maritimus Fairmaire, 1862 
 Lionychus orientalis K.Daniel, 1901 
 Lionychus planus Mateu, 1978 
 Lionychus quadrillum (Duftschmid, 1812) 
 Lionychus sturmii (Gene, 1836)

References

Lebiinae